Sekaha is a small village in Khandbari Municipality Ward No. 5 of Sankhuwasabha District of Eastern Nepal.

References

Populated places in Sankhuwasabha District